Alexandre de Bauffremont (1773–1833) was prince-duke of Bauffremont.

In 1787 he married Marie-Antoinette, daughter of Paul François de Quelen de La Vauguyon. He emigrated to Koblenz on the French Revolution but rallied to Napoleon and accepted the title of comte de l'Empire. He was made a peer of France in 1815 by Louis XVIII.

1773 births
1833 deaths
Dukes of Bauffremont
French princes
Counts of the First French Empire
Peers of France